Stefan "Stevo" Karapandža (born 27 May 1947) is a Yugoslavian, Croatian and Serbian celebrity chef. With Ivo Serdar, and later Oliver Mlakar, he co-hosted the popular Yugoslav weekly cooking show Little Secrets of Great Chefs produced by TV Zagreb starting in 1974.

At the start of the Yugoslav Wars in 1991, he received numerous threats from Croatian nationalists because of his Serb origins. He then left Zagreb for Italy and settled in Switzerland, where he now lives and operates a restaurant in Ennetbaden. Of paternal Serb and maternal Croat descent, in 2004 he was ranked tenth in the Greatest Croatian poll conducted by Croatian weekly Nacional.

The author of a number of popular cookbooks dating back to the 1980s, Karapandža's cookbook Moji najdraži recepti (My Favorite Recipes) was published in 2009.

References

Living people
1947 births
Croatian television chefs
Writers from Zagreb
Croatian emigrants to Switzerland
Serbs of Croatia